Van Roosmalen or van Roosmalen may refer to:


People
Marc van Roosmalen, a Dutch-Brazilian primatologist.
Robin van Roosmalen, a Dutch kickboxer and mixed martial artist.
Teigan Van Roosmalen, an Australian Paralympic swimmer.